Houssam El Kord (also spelled El-Kord, born 24 February 1993) is a Moroccan fencer. His sister Camélia El Kord is also a fencer who has represented Morocco at international level. He currently lives in France and also serves as a freelance chiropodist in Paris.

Career 
He obtained his bachelor's degree in life sciences from the Pierre and Marie Curie University in 2013. He was influenced by his elder sister Camélia El Kord to take up turn sport of fencing.

He claimed a gold medal in the men's individual épée at the 2019 African Games. He represented Morocco at the 2020 Summer Olympics which also marked his debut appearance at the Olympics. During the 2020 Summer Olympics, he competed in the men's épée event.

References

External links

 
 
 
 

1993 births
Living people
Moroccan male épée fencers
Competitors at the 2019 African Games
African Games gold medalists for Morocco
African Games medalists in fencing
Fencers at the 2020 Summer Olympics
Olympic fencers of Morocco
African Games competitors for Morocco
French sportspeople of Moroccan descent
Moroccan expatriates in France
Pierre and Marie Curie University alumni
African Games silver medalists for Morocco
Mediterranean Games bronze medalists for Morocco
Competitors at the 2018 Mediterranean Games
Mediterranean Games medalists in fencing
20th-century Moroccan people
21st-century Moroccan people